Jessie Carson was an American librarian who was appointed the director of children's libraries for the American Committee for Devastated France in 1920. Along with several other children's librarians on leave of absence from the New York Public Library, Carson rehabilitated four libraries devastated by the war and began training young French women in American librarianship practices. She is credited with making lasting change in French libraries, particularly by extending services to children, who had not traditionally been served by French libraries.

References 

American librarians
American women librarians
American women in World War I
Year of birth missing
Year of death missing
20th-century American people